Eran Segal (born 15 November 1973) is a computational biologist professor at the Weizmann Institute of Science. He works on developing quantitative models for all levels of gene regulation, including transcription, chromatin, and translation.  Segal also works as an epidemiologist.

He gained his BA in Computer Science and Economics from Tel Aviv University in 1998 and his PhD from  Stanford University under a Fulbright Scholarship in 2004 advised by Daphne Koller. In 2007 he was awarded the Overton Prize by the International Society for Computational Biology. In 2011 he was made a professor at the Weizmann Institute of Science.

Over the years, Segal published more than 140 articles in scientific and medical journals, of which about 20 in the journal Nature Cell Biology.

Personalized Nutrition

Segal claims there is no "One size fits all" diet, in the sense that people will respond differently to certain types of food.

Through a study utilizing continuous glucose monitoring and food journals, he produced some evidence that the glucose response to specific foods  differ significantly between people. He hypothesized that personalized food plans based on further research could be beneficial in reducing the occurrence of diabetes.

Later, he employed blood DNA testing, feces analysis (gut bacteria) to gather data which was analysed with a machine learning method to create personalized diets that were expected to improve glucose responses after eating. This method was tested on a population size of 26, the results of the study supported his hypothesis, though required further testing.

References

Living people
Overton Prize winners
Israeli bioinformaticians
Stanford University alumni
Tel Aviv University alumni
Academic staff of Weizmann Institute of Science
1973 births
Israeli epidemiologists